The 2010 Players Championship was a golf tournament in Florida on the PGA Tour, held  at TPC Sawgrass in Ponte Vedra Beach, southeast of Jacksonville. It was the 37th Players Championship.

Tim Clark won with a 67 on Sunday for his first PGA Tour victory, one stroke ahead of Robert Allenby.

Two unusual events occurred during this Players Championship. For the first time in tournament history, a spectator was arrested and forcibly removed from the course. An intoxicated fan who was screaming and being disruptive refused to listen to course officials, who then called deputies. The man resisted arrest and was tasered. In a separate incident, hours after the first round had ended a car was discovered parked on the 8th green with two occupants inside and the motor running. When the driver refused to follow instructions, law enforcement was called. The green was not damaged and the couple was issued trespass warnings, then escorted off the course.

Defending champion Henrik Stenson missed the 36-hole cut by a stroke.

Venue

Course layout

Field
The field consisted of 144 players meeting criteria 1–12, plus the winner of the 2009 Senior Players Championship.

1. Winners of PGA Tour events since last Players
Stephen Ames (3,6), Cameron Beckman (3), Jason Bohn (3), Stewart Cink (2,3,5,9), Ben Crane (3,11), Ernie Els (2,3,7,9,11), Jim Furyk (2,3,9,11), Brian Gay (2,3), Lucas Glover (2,3,5,9), Nathan Green (3), Bill Haas (3,11), Dustin Johnson (2,3,9,11), Zach Johnson (2,3,5,9), Matt Kuchar (3,9,11), Martin Laird (3), Derek Lamely, Hunter Mahan (2,3,9), Troy Matteson (3), Rory McIlroy (9), Phil Mickelson (2,3,5,6,7,8,9,11), Ryan Moore (3), Geoff Ogilvy (2,3,5,7,9), Ryan Palmer, Kenny Perry (2,3,9), Ian Poulter (3,7,9), John Rollins (3), Rory Sabbatini (3), Heath Slocum (2,3), Henrik Stenson (6,9), Bo Van Pelt (3), Camilo Villegas (3,8,9,11), Tiger Woods (2,3,5,7,8,9), Yang Yong-eun (2,3,5,9)
Anthony Kim (3,9,11) and Steve Stricker (2,3,9,11) did not play.

2. Top 30 from previous season's FedEx Cup points list
Ángel Cabrera (3,5,9), Luke Donald (3,9), Jason Dufner (3), Pádraig Harrington (3,5,9), Jerry Kelly (3), Marc Leishman (3), Steve Marino (3), Kevin Na (3,9), Sean O'Hair (3,9), John Senden (3), David Toms (3), Scott Verplank (3), Nick Watney (3,9), Mike Weir (3)
Retief Goosen (3,9) did not play.

3. Top 125 from previous season's PGA Tour money list
Michael Allen, Robert Allenby (9), Woody Austin, Aaron Baddeley, Briny Baird, Ricky Barnes, Matt Bettencourt, Michael Bradley, Jonathan Byrd, Mark Calcavecchia, Chad Campbell, Paul Casey (9), Alex Čejka, Greg Chalmers, K. J. Choi (9), Daniel Chopra, Tim Clark (9), Ben Curtis, Brian Davis, Jason Day, James Driscoll, Bob Estes, Steve Flesch, Harrison Frazar, Sergio García (6,9), Mathew Goggin, Paul Goydos, J. J. Henry, Charley Hoffman, J. B. Holmes, Charles Howell III, Ryuji Imada, Freddie Jacobson, Lee Janzen, Richard S. Johnson, Jeff Klauk, Justin Leonard, Michael Letzig, Davis Love III, Bill Lunde, John Mallinger, Scott McCarron, George McNeill, John Merrick, Bryce Molder, James Nitties, Nick O'Hern, Jeff Overton, Greg Owen, Rod Pampling, Pat Perez, Tim Petrovic, Scott Piercy, D. A. Points, Ted Purdy, Brett Quigley, Jeff Quinney, Andrés Romero, Justin Rose, Adam Scott (9), Webb Simpson, Vijay Singh (7,9), Brandt Snedeker, Kevin Stadler, Kevin Streelman, Chris Stroud, Kevin Sutherland, Vaughn Taylor, Roland Thatcher, Nicholas Thompson, D. J. Trahan, Jimmy Walker, Bubba Watson, Boo Weekley, Charlie Wi, Mark Wilson
Rich Beem, Fred Couples, and Tom Watson did not play.

4. Top 125 from current season - Medical Extension

5. Major champions from the past five years
Trevor ImmelmanMichael Campbell did not play.6. Players Championship winners from the past five years
Fred Funk

7. WGC winners from the past three years (except WGC-HSBC Champions)

8. The Tour Championship winners from the past three years

9. Top 50 from the Official World Golf Ranking as of April 25
Ross Fisher, Thongchai Jaidee, Robert Karlsson, Martin Kaymer, Graeme McDowell, Francesco Molinari, Álvaro Quirós, Charl Schwartzel, Lee Westwood, Oliver WilsonSøren Hansen, Yuta Ikeda, Ryo Ishikawa, Miguel Ángel Jiménez, Edoardo Molinari, Louis Oosthuizen, and Michael Sim (10) did not play.10. Nationwide Tour money leader from prior season

11. Top 10 current year FedEx Cup points leaders as of April 25

12. Field filled to 144 through current year FedEx Cup standings as of April 25
Kris Blanks, Chad Collins, Chris Couch, Brendon de Jonge, Rickie Fowler, J. P. Hayes, Spencer Levin, Troy Merritt, Alex Prugh

13. Senior Players champion from prior year (did not count against field of 144)
Jay Haas

Nationalities in the field

Round summaries
First roundThursday, May 6, 2010Second roundFriday, May 7, 2010Third roundSaturday, May 8, 2010Final roundSunday, May 9, 2010Three strokes back, Tim Clark shot a bogey-free final round 67, ending with an  par putt and was the clubhouse leader. Lee Westwood, the 54-hole leader, was even par through sixteen holes, but a water ball on the famed 17th hole led to a double bogey and ended any chance of victory. In the end it came down to Robert Allenby, in the final pairing and two strokes behind Clark with three holes to play. After just missing an eagle on the par 5 16th, the lead was cut to one. He had a last chance at 18, but failed to make birdie and Clark gained his first PGA Tour victory in his 206th start.

ScorecardCumulative tournament scores, relative to par''
{|class="wikitable" span = 50 style="font-size:85%;
|-
|  style="background:Red; width:10px;"|
|Eagle
|  style="background:Pink; width:10px;"|
|Birdie
|  style="background:PaleGreen; width:10px;"|
|Bogey
|  style="background:Green; width:10px;"|
|Double bogey
|}
Source:

References

External links
The Players Championship website

2010
2010 in golf
2010 in American sports
2010 in sports in Florida
May 2010 sports events in the United States